Paolo Conte Bonin (born 9 February 2002) is an Italian swimmer.

World records

Short course (25 m)
  freestyle relay: 3:02.75 ( Melbourne, 13 December 2022) with Alessandro Miressi, Leonardo Deplano, Thomas Ceccon - Current holder.

See also
 World record progression 4 × 100 metres freestyle relay - Men's short course

References

External links
 

2002 births
Living people
Italian male freestyle swimmers
Medalists at the FINA World Swimming Championships (25 m)